Watapur District is situated in the central part of Kunar Province in Afghanistan. It was split from Asadabad district. The district is mountainous with 60 large and small villages. The population is around 60,000 (2022 est.). Degan, Safi, Ragakhel, Sharbekhel, Nanekhel, Doshakhel, Kohestani, Saidan are the few tribes living in this beautiful place. Watapur District has a high school located in south part of the district. The villages are located in the valleys or in the high mountains, with difficult or no road access to the center - Asadabad, and it takes one day to reach some of them. There was a medical clinic north of Qatar Kala, built by ISAF, until it was destroyed by local militants.

The district is bisected by the Pech (east-west) and Tregami (north-south) rivers. The district capital, the village of Watapur, lies near the junction of these two rivers. The Tregami valley is broad and agricultural in the south and narrow and mountainous in the north.

Most of the inhabitants of the district are Pashtuns. In the northern end of the Tregami valley are found three villages of Nuristanis who speak the unique Tregami Language. To the north of the district is the Waygal district of Nuristan Province, whose inhabitants speak the Nuristani Waygali (or Kalasha) Language. The village of Watapur was formerly inhabited by speakers of the Wotapuri Pech River Dardic (Indic) Language. The village of Qatar Kala, in the west of the district, still speaks a dialect of Watapori.

Coalition forces completed the construction of the paved Pech River road through the district in 2008. The road runs along the north bank of the Pech River.

Rasul Amin son of Mohammad Amin who was the Minister of Education of Afghan Interim Administration in 2001–2002, belongs to this district. The majority of the educated population of this district lives now in United States of America, Australia, Germany, Russia, and The Netherlands.

The Coalition base Combat Outpost Honaker-Miracle is located in the district next to the district center. This base was constructed on land that was seized by the U.S. military without compensation.

In 2012, the book "Siren's Song: The Allure of War" by Antonio Salinas was published. The book depicts the experience of an American Platoon operating in the Pech river valley. The platoon was based at COP Honaker Miracle.

See also
Districts of Afghanistan

References 
District Profile

External links

Districts of Kunar Province